Godavarisaurus was a sphenodontid reptile from the Early Jurassic (Hettangian to Pliensbachian) Kota Formation of Andhra Pradesh, India.

See also

 Rhynchocephalia

References

Sphenodontia
Jurassic lepidosaurs
Extinct animals of India
Prehistoric reptile genera